Jaden Schwartz (born June 25, 1992) is a Canadian professional ice hockey player and alternate captain for the Seattle Kraken of the National Hockey League (NHL). Schwartz was selected 14th overall by the St. Louis Blues in the 2010 NHL Entry Draft. Schwartz won the Stanley Cup as a member of the Blues in 2019, leading the team in goal scoring during the playoffs.

Playing career

Minor hockey
Schwartz played minor hockey at Athol Murray College of Notre Dame in Wilcox, Saskatchewan. As a bantam, Schwartz helped Notre Dame to win the Kamloops International Bantam Ice Hockey Tournament in 2006 and 2007. In 2007, he also played at the midget level, helping the Hounds to a victory at the 2007 Mac's AAA midget hockey tournament. Schwartz and Notre Dame played at the Mac's Tournament again in 2008. Schwartz was named the Saskatchewan Midget AAA Hockey League Top Forward for the 2007–08 season after leading the league in scoring. While playing Midget AAA at the school, he scored 39 goals and added 72 assists in 44 games to break team scoring records previously held by Vincent Lecavalier and Brad Richards.

Junior
Schwartz began his hockey career playing junior ice hockey for his hometown Notre Dame Hounds in the Saskatchewan Junior Hockey League. During the 2008–09 season with the Hounds, Schwartz finished fifth in league scoring with 34 goals and 42 assists in 46 games. At the end of the season, he was named the SJHL's Rookie of the Year. Schwartz transferred to the Tri-City Storm of the American Tier I Jr. A United States Hockey League. Schwartz captured the 2009–10 USHL scoring title with 83 points in 60 games. He was also named to the league's First All-Star Team and was awarded Top Offensive Player honours.

College

On January 22, 2008, Schwartz committed to play NCAA Division I college ice hockey at Colorado College of the Western Collegiate Hockey Association (WCHA) for the 2010–11 season. Schwartz helped Colorado College to an NCAA Tournament appearance where the team was seeded in the West regional held at the Scottrade Center, in St. Louis. In the first round, he recorded two goals and two assists to help Colorado College defeat the reigning NCAA champion and number one-seeded Boston College 8–4. He also assisted on the lone goal, scored by his brother, Rylan Schwartz, in the second-round game against Michigan. Schwartz finished his freshman season at Colorado College with 17 goals and 30 assists for 47 points in 30 games. His 47 points was first on the team and he recorded four game-winning goals and eight powerplay goals.

During his sophomore season at Colorado College, Schwartz recorded 15 goals and 26 assists for 41 points in only 30 games, missing six due to the World Junior Tournament. He led the Tigers in points and assists for the season;
 four of his 15 goals were recorded as game-winning goals and five of his goals came on the power play. On March 10, 2012, Colorado College lost 3–4 in overtime to Michigan Tech in the first round of the WCHA playoffs. On March 12, 2012, Schwartz decided to forgo his final two years of NCAA eligibility and signed a three-year entry level contract with the St. Louis Blues.

Professional

St. Louis Blues
The St. Louis Blues signed Schwartz to an entry-level contract on March 12, 2012, subsequently adding him to their NHL roster. After travelling and practicing with the team for a week, he was given his first opportunity for NHL play after winger Andy McDonald received a shoulder injury. Schwartz made his NHL debut on March 17, 2012, in Tampa Bay, skating on the second line with Jamie Langenbrunner and Patrik Berglund. During the game, he scored his first NHL goal, a game-winner, from his first NHL shot on the powerplay at the 19:24 mark of the first period, when he intercepted a rebound in front of the net and beat goaltender Dwayne Roloson. On September 27, 2014, Schwartz agreed to a two-year, $4.7 million contract extension with the Blues after an off-season surrounded with uncertainty about whether he would rejoin the club. Following Vladimír Sobotka's departure for the KHL's Avangard Omsk, Schwartz switched to number 17 beginning in the 2014–15 season, having previously worn number 9 in his Blues career. The change made as a tribute to his late sister, who wore the number playing hockey at Yale, before being diagnosed with leukemia.

On July 15, 2016, the Blues signed Schwartz to a five-year contract for $26.75 million, avoiding arbitration.

Schwartz won the 2019 Stanley Cup Finals with the Blues, St. Louis' first Stanley Cup in their 52-year franchise history. He had two hat tricks during the playoffs and led the Blues in playoff goals with 12 goals.

Seattle Kraken
Following the  season, his tenth with the Blues and having concluded his contract, Schwartz embarked upon free agency for the first time in his career. On July 28, 2021, Schwartz was signed by expansion club, the Seattle Kraken, agreeing to a five-year, $27.5 million contract. On January 6, 2022, the Kraken announced Schwartz would not be able to play for about a month due to a hand injury. He was activated from the injured reserve on March 5, 2022.

International play

Schwartz represents Canada internationally. His first experience with Hockey Canada came while representing Team West at the World Junior A Challenge in 2008, capturing a silver medal and the World Under-17 Hockey Challenge in 2009, with a fourth-place finish. Schwartz helped Canada capture a gold medal at the 2009 Ivan Hlinka Memorial Tournament. Schwartz scored a goal and added an assist in the gold medal game. He was selected to represent Canada at the 2011 World Junior Championships. In his second game of the tournament, against the Czech Republic, Schwartz suffered a fractured ankle and was sidelined for the rest of the tournament. He was selected the next year to Team Canada for the 2012 World Junior Championships in Edmonton and Calgary and named team captain. Playing Russia in the semifinal, Schwartz recorded a goal and five shots to be named Canada's player of the game in a 6–5 losing effort. He finished the tournament with five points (two goals and three assists) over six games, as Canada won the bronze medal over Finland.

On April 12, 2018, Schwartz was named to Team Canada's senior team for the first time to compete at the 2018 IIHF World Championship.

Personal life
Schwartz was born in Melfort, Saskatchewan and grew up in Wilcox, Saskatchewan, to Rick and Carol Schwartz. He has an older brother, Rylan, who also played hockey at Colorado College, and now plays for the Frankfurt Lions (Löwen Frankfurt) of the German DEL, and  an older sister Mandi who played hockey with the Yale Bulldogs women's ice hockey team until she was diagnosed with acute myeloid leukemia in December 2008. Despite trying to find a donor for Mandi and, in the process, raising awareness of bone marrow and stem cell transplants, Mandi died in April 2011 following a third relapse of the cancer.

Career statistics

Regular season and playoffs

International

Awards and honors

References

External links

 

1992 births
Living people
Athol Murray College of Notre Dame alumni
Canadian ice hockey centres
Colorado College Tigers men's ice hockey players
Ice hockey people from Saskatchewan
National Hockey League first-round draft picks
Notre Dame Hounds players
People from Melfort, Saskatchewan
Peoria Rivermen (AHL) players
Seattle Kraken players
St. Louis Blues draft picks
St. Louis Blues players
Stanley Cup champions
AHCA Division I men's ice hockey All-Americans